Nordair  was a Quebec-based airline in Canada founded in 1947 from the merger of Boreal Airways and Mont Laurier Aviation.

History
The airline operated from the 1940s to the 1980s. Initially, most of its business was international and transatlantic passenger and freight charters and other contracts. It also operated scheduled flights to a number of destinations in eastern Canada and the Northwest Territories. Nordair flew out of Montreal's two airports: initially from Dorval Airport, now Montréal–Trudeau International Airport, and later from Montréal–Mirabel International Airport as this latter airfield did not open until 1975. It was headquartered in Montreal with operations at Dorval, Quebec and their head office at 1320 Boulevard Graham in Mont Royal.

Nordair was operating scheduled passenger services in July 1959 utilizing Douglas DC-3 and Douglas DC-4 propeller aircraft with routings of Montreal - Frobisher Bay (now Iqaluit) - Cape Dyer Airport; Montreal - Roberval - Fort Chimo (now Kuujjuaq) - Frobisher Bay; and Montreal - Quebec City - Roberval - Chibougamau.

The airline was still operating scheduled passenger flights 20 years later. According to Nordair's July 1, 1979 system timetable and route map, jet service was being operated as far west as Winnipeg and as far north as the Resolute Bay Airport in the Canadian Arctic with a number of destinations in Ontario and Quebec in Canada being served including Montreal (via Dorval Airport), Ottawa, Toronto, Quebec City, Hamilton, Ontario and Windsor, Ontario as well as Pittsburgh in the United States, primarily with Boeing 737-200 jetliners but also with Fairchild Hiller FH-227 turboprop aircraft. The airline was also operating scheduled passenger flights in 1975 with Lockheed L-188 Electra turboprop aircraft primarily to destinations in Quebec. Nordair was continuing to operate scheduled passenger flights in 1986 primarily with Boeing 737-200 jets.

Introduction of Boeing 737 jet aircraft

The airline was operating Boeing 737-200 passenger jet service in 1969 in both scheduled and charter operations according to the June 15, 1970 Nordair system timetable which contained the following marketing message concerning its leisure charter flights: SUNNY HOLIDAYS - BLUE TAIL JET CHARTER FLIGHTS TO THE SUN....BARBADOS - JAMAICA - BAHAMAS - FLORIDA - MEXICO. This same timetable also lists scheduled passenger service operated by Nordair with the Boeing 737-200 between Montreal Dorval and Fort Chimo (now Kuujjuaq), Frobisher Bay (now Iqaluit), Great Whale (now Kuujjuarapik), Hamilton and Resolute.

Merger and aftermath

Nordair was purchased by Canadian Pacific Air Lines which had operated as CP Air. On March 27, 1987, Pacific Western Airlines purchased Canadian Pacific Air Lines and then emerged as Canadian Airlines. The jet operation was absorbed into Canadian Airlines, while the turboprop operations were absorbed into Inter-Canadien. In 2000, that airline was acquired by Air Canada.

Intair, a scheduled passenger airline that was based in Canada and operated jet and turboprop aircraft, used Nordair's two letter "ND" airline code for its domestic flights in eastern Canada in 1989 until it ceased operations and went out of business.

Another company called Nordair Quebec 2000 Incorporated operated in 2000 as a domestic regional carrier and cargo operator in Quebec, but the licence and licence applications for the airline were suspended in 2006 by Transport Canada, and again the Nordair name disappeared from the airline industry

Destinations
The following destinations in Canada were served by Nordair with scheduled passenger flights during the airline's existence:

Canada
 Ontario
 Dryden, Dryden Regional Airport
 Hamilton, John C. Munro Hamilton International Airport
 Kingston, Kingston Norman Rogers Airport
 Oshawa, Oshawa Executive Airport
 Ottawa, Ottawa Macdonald–Cartier International Airport
 Sarnia, Sarnia Chris Hadfield Airport
 Sault Ste. Marie, Sault Ste. Marie Airport
 Sudbury, Sudbury Airport
 Thunder Bay, Thunder Bay International Airport
 Toronto, Malton Airport
 Windsor, Windsor International Airport

 Quebec
 Raglan Mines (Asbestos Hill / Deception Bay), Kattiniq/Donaldson Airport
 Bagotville (La Baie), Bagotville Airport
 Chibougamau, Chibougamau/Chapais Airport
 Dolbeau, Dolbeau-Saint-Félicien Airport
 Kuujjuaq (formerly known as Fort Chimo), Kuujjuaq Airport
 Great Whale / Poste-de-la-Baleine (now Kuujjuarapik), Kuujjuarapik Airport
 Matagami, Matagami Airport
 Montreal, Montréal–Mirabel International Airport
 Montreal, Montréal–Trudeau International Airport (Dorval Airport)
 Quebec City, Québec City Jean Lesage International Airport
 Radisson (La Grande), La Grande Rivière Airport
 Roberval, Roberval Airport
 Rouyn-Noranda, Rouyn-Noranda Airport
 Val-d'Or, Val-d'Or Airport
 Manitoba
 Winnipeg, Winnipeg James Armstrong Richardson International Airport
 Nunavut
 Arctic Bay, Nanisivik Airport
 Broughton Island (now Qikiqtarjuaq), Broughton Island Airport
 Cape Dorset (now Kinngait), Cape Dorset Airport
 Cape Dyer, Cape Dyer Airport
 Clyde River / Cape Christian, Clyde River Airport
 Coral Harbour, Coral Harbour Airport
 Hall Beach (now Sanirajak), Hall Beach Airport
 Igloolik, Igloolik Airport
 Frobisher Bay (now Iqaluit), Iqaluit Airport
 Nanisivik, Nanisivik Airport
 Pangnirtung, Pangnirtung Airport
 Pelly Bay (now Kugaaruk), Kugaaruk Airport
 Resolute, Resolute Bay Airport
 Northwest Territories
 Inuvik, Inuvik (Mike Zubko) Airport
 Yellowknife, Yellowknife Airport

Outside of Canada
Most of the flights to the United States, the Bahamas, the Caribbean, Mexico and Europe were charter flights, as Nordair operated only a few scheduled passenger services outside of Canada.
 North America
 Barbados
Grantley Adams International Airport
 The Bahamas
Grand Bahama, Grand Bahama International Airport
Varadero, Cuba
 Jamaica
 Mexico
Cancún, Cancún International Airport
 United States
 Detroit, Detroit Metropolitan Airport
 Fort Lauderdale Fort Lauderdale–Hollywood International Airport
 Los Angeles, Los Angeles International Airport
 Miami, Miami International Airport
 New York City, John F. Kennedy International Airport
 Omaha, Eppley Airfield
 Orlando, Orlando International Airport
 Pittsburgh, Pittsburgh International Airport
 Tampa Bay, St. Pete–Clearwater International Airport
 SeaTac, Washington, Seattle–Tacoma International Airport
 Van Nuys, Van Nuys Airport

 Europe
 Amsterdam, Amsterdam Airport Schiphol
 Athens, Ellinikon International Airport
 Budapest, Budapest Ferenc Liszt International Airport
 Copenhagen, Copenhagen Airport
 Düsseldorf, Düsseldorf Airport
 Frankfurt, Frankfurt Airport
 Glasgow, Abbotsinch Airport
 London, Gatwick Airport
 Manchester, Manchester Airport
 Shannon, Shannon Airport

Military contract flight services

Nordair served as an air service contractor to the Canadian Armed Forces, including ice reconnaissance missions flown with a Lockheed L-188 Electra turboprop aircraft and United States Air Force support flights to Distant Early Warning Line stations from Alaska to Baffin Island.

Fleet
Nordair had the following aircraft registered by Transport Canada and listed in their timetables. Over the years they had at least 40 aircraft.

The Boeing 737 fleet included the combi aircraft version for mixed passenger/freight operations.

Nordair also operated de Havilland Canada DHC-6 Twin Otter STOL capable turboprop aircraft during the early and mid 1970s in scheduled passenger service between the community of Frobisher Bay (now Iqaluit) and various local destinations in this region of the Canadian Arctic.

Another type operated by the airline was the Grumman G-73 Mallard amphibious aircraft which had been converted with turboprop engines and was capable of landing on both land and water (see above photo).

In addition, a division of Nordair, Nordair Metro, was operating Convair 580 turboprop aircraft in 1986.

Accidents and incidents
On 6 February 1973, the Douglas C-47B CF-HTH was damaged beyond economic repair when it was hit by a vehicle at an airport in Montreal.
On 15 November 1975, Douglas C-47 C-FCSC was damaged beyond economic repair by a fire at La Grande Rivière Airport, Radisson, Quebec.
On 31 March 1977 Lockheed L-188 Electra CF-NAZ, while parked on the ramp at CFB Summerside, was severely damaged when a Canadian Armed Forces CP-107 (tail 10737) attempted a three-engine landing in bad weather. She was later rebuilt in Van Nuys and re-registered as C-GNDZ.

See also 
 List of defunct airlines of Canada

References

External links 

Nordair

Defunct airlines of Canada
Airlines established in 1947
Airlines disestablished in 1987
1947 establishments in Quebec
Defunct seaplane operators